Ali Shafique (born 16 November 1996) is a Pakistani cricketer. He made his List A debut for Habib Bank Limited in the 2016–17 Departmental One Day Cup on 17 December 2016. He made his first-class debut for Khan Research Laboratories in the 2017–18 Quaid-e-Azam Trophy on 9 October 2017. He made his Twenty20 debut for Lahore Blues in the 2017–18 National T20 Cup on 18 November 2017. During the 2019 Pakistan Super League tournament he played for Multan Sultans, and was noticed during his first match, with bowling figures of 2/11 off 4 overs against Islamabad United, eventually earning the man-of-the-match award, while pace-wise also clocking at 142 km/h.

In September 2019, he was named in Balochistan's squad for the 2019–20 Quaid-e-Azam Trophy tournament.

References

External links
 

1996 births
Living people
Pakistani cricketers
Habib Bank Limited cricketers
Khan Research Laboratories cricketers
Lahore Blues cricketers
People from Sialkot District
Punjabi people
Multan Sultans cricketers